
This is a list of AEW Rampage episodes including episode number, location, venue and that night's main event. The show is broadcast in simulcast with TNT in the U.S (but is subject to scheduling).

All dates, venues and main events are per the "results" page on the official AEW website.

2021

2022

2023

See also 

 List of AEW Dynamite episodes
 List of AEW Dark episodes
 List of AEW Dark: Elevation episodes
 List of WWE Raw special episodes
 List of WWE SmackDown special episodes

References 

All Elite Wrestling lists
Lists of American non-fiction television series episodes